Hard Working Americans is an American rock supergroup formed in 2013. The band consists of singer Todd Snider, bassist Dave Schools from Widespread Panic, Chad Staehly of Great American Taxi on keyboards and Duane Trucks, also from Widespread Panic, younger brother to Derek, on drums. Guitarist and vocalist Neal Casal died in 2019.

Their debut performance was December 20, 2013 at a Boulder, CO benefit for Colorado Flood Relief. They embarked on a US Tour shortly thereafter.

Their self-titled debut album Hard Working Americans was recorded in 2013 at Bob Weir's TRI Studios in San Rafael, CA.   It is composed entirely of cover songs from artists ranging from Randy Newman to Drivin N Cryin.  The album was produced by Schools and Snider, and was mixed by John Keane. John Popper guests on harmonica.  Hard Working Americans was released on January 21, 2014 on Thirty Tigers/Melvin Records  

In 2016, the band released their second album, Rest in Chaos, which unlike their previous record, is composed primarily of original songs written by the band themselves. The exception is the track "The High Price of Inspiration," written by Guy Clark for his album My Favorite Picture of You. Clark has a cameo speaking, and also plays guitar on the track. Rest in Chaos was written and recorded live as the band was finishing their first tour; using Snider's poetry to start the lyric, he finished the songs after principle recording was complete. The album was produced by band member Dave Schools, and also featured the addition of Jesse Aycock to the band's lineup. Longtime friend and collaborator Elizabeth Cook sings on the track "Massacre."

In 2019, founding guitarist Neal Casal died.

Members

 Todd Snider
 Dave Schools
 Chad Staehly
 Duane Trucks
 Jesse Aycock

Former members

 Neal Casal (2013 - 2019; his death)

Releases

Studio albums
 2014 Hard Working Americans - Thirty Tigers / Melvin Records
 2016 Rest in Chaos - Melvin Records

Singles
 2013 "Down to the Well" - Thirty Tigers / Melvin Records
 2014 "Stomp and Holler"
 2016 "Opening Statement"

Live albums
 2014 The First Waltz - Melvin Records
 2017 We're All In This Together - Melvin/Thirty Tigers

References

External links
 Official website

Rock music groups from California
Rock music supergroups
Musical groups established in 2013
2013 establishments in the United States
Thirty Tigers artists